Williams County is located on the western border of the U.S. state of North Dakota, next to Montana. As of the 2020 census, the population was 40,950. Its county seat is Williston.  

The Williston Micropolitan Statistical Area includes all of Williams County. It is bordered on the south by the upper Missouri River, whose confluence with its tributary Yellowstone River is located just east of the border with Montana.

History
There have been two Williams counties in the history of North Dakota. The first, created in 1873, was located south of the Missouri River near where Dunn and Mercer counties are today. This county continued to exist through North Dakota statehood, and while the second Williams County was created in 1891. The first Williams County was extinguished by a county referendum on November 8, 1892; part of its territory was absorbed by Mercer County and the rest reverted to an unorganized territory.

The second Williams County was created by the North Dakota legislature on March 2, 1891, from the previous counties of Buford and Flannery, which were dissolved. The government of this county was organized on December 8, 1891. This county's boundaries were altered in 1910, when a portion of its territory was annexed to create Divide County. Its boundaries have remained unchanged since then.

The county is named for Erastus Appleman Williams, a European-American settler who served in the Dakota Territory legislature and the North Dakota legislature.

Geography
Williams County lies on the west edge of North Dakota. Its west boundary line abuts the east boundary line of the state of Montana. The Missouri River flows eastward along the county's south boundary line from the confluence with its tributary Yellowstone River, located on the Dakota side of the state border with Montana. Horse Creek and Willow Creek flow to the west across the upper portion of the county. The terrain consists of isolated hills amid rolling, hilly, semi-arid stretches. The area is partly devoted to agriculture. The terrain is highest across its midpoint, and slopes to the NW and SE. Its highest point is a hill near the NE corner, at 2,470' (753m) ASL. It is the fourth-largest county in North Dakota by area.

Lake Sakakawea, a reservoir on the Missouri River, is situated on the southern boundary of the county. Little Muddy Creek is entirely within Williams County. The confluence of the Yellowstone River with the Missouri is west of Williston.

The Fort Union Trading Post National Historic Site is located in Williams County along the Missouri River on the Montana border.

Williams County is one of several western North Dakota counties with significant exposure to the Bakken formation in the Williston Basin.

Major highways

Adjacent counties

 Divide County (north)
 Burke County (northeast)
 Mountrail County (east)
 McKenzie County (south)
 Roosevelt County, Montana (southwest)
 Sheridan County, Montana (west)

Protected areas

 Fort Union Trading Post National Historic Site (part)
 Hofflund State Game Management Area
 Lewis & Clark State Park
 Lake Zahl National Wildlife Refuge
 North Tobacco Garden State Game Management Area

Lakes

 Alkali Lake
 Blacktail Lake
 Cottonwood Lake
 Epping Dam
 Green Lake
 Helle Slough
 Holm Lake
 Lake Trenton
 Lake Zahl
 McLeod Lake
 Shirley Lake
 Tioga River Dam
 Twin Lakes

KotaRay Dam

Demographics

2000 census
As of the 2000 census, there were 19,761 people, 8,095 households, and 5,261 families in the county. The population density was 10 people per square mile (4/km2). There were 9,680 housing units at an average density of 5 per square mile (2/km2). The racial makeup of the county was 92.95% White, 0.12% Black or African American, 4.40% Native American, 0.18% Asian, 0.01% Pacific Islander, 0.14% from other races, and 2.21% from two or more races. 0.94% of the population were Hispanic or Latino of any race. 48.3% were of Norwegian and 22.0% German ancestry.

There were 8,095 households, out of which 31.2% had children under the age of 18 living with them, 53.3% were married couples living together, 8.8% had a female householder with no husband present, and 35.0% were non-families. Of all households 30.9% were made up of individuals, and 13.1% had someone living alone who was 65 years of age or older. The average household size was 2.38 and the average family size was 2.99.

The county population contained 26.2% under the age of 18, 7.80% from 18 to 24, 25.5% from 25 to 44, 24.0% from 45 to 64, and 16.5% who were 65 years of age or older. The median age was 40 years. For every 100 females there were 96.2 males. For every 100 females age 18 and over, there were 93.6 males.

The median income for a household in the county was $31,491, and the median income for a family was $39,065. Males had a median income of $29,884 versus $19,329 for females. The per capita income for the county was $16,763. About 9.6% of families and 11.9% of the population were below the poverty line, including 16.5% of those under age 18 and 8.1% of those age 65 or over.

2010 census
As of the 2010 census, there were 22,398 people, 9,293 households, and 5,746 families in the county. The racial makeup of the county was 92.1% white, 4.0% American Indian, 0.4% Asian, 0.3% black or African American, 0.3% from other races, and 2.9% from two or more races. Those of Hispanic or Latino origin made up 1.9% of the population. In terms of ancestry, 46.2% were of Norwegian, 35.9% of German, 9.8% of Irish, 4.5% of Swedish and 4.4% of English ancestry.

Of the 9,293 households, 28.5% had children under the age of 18 living with them, 49.8% were married couples living together, 7.7% had a female householder with no husband present, 38.2% were non-families, and 31.5% of all households were made up of individuals. The average household size was 2.35 and the average family size was 2.95. The median age was 39.0 years.

The median income for a household in the county was $55,396 and the median income for a family was $67,875. Males had a median income of $50,735 versus $27,071 for females. The per capita income for the county was $29,153. About 4.7% of families and 8.7% of the population were below the poverty line, including 9.7% of those under age 18 and 10.4% of those age 65 or over.

Media
 The Williston Herald

Communities

Cities

 Alamo
 Epping
 Grenora
 Ray
 Springbrook
 Tioga
 Wildrose
 Williston (county seat)

Census-designated places
 Blacktail
 Long Creek
 McGregor
 Trenton

Other unincorporated communities

 Appam
 Bonetraill
 Buford
 Corinth
 Hamlet
 Hanks
 Lunds Landing
 Temple
 Wheelock
 Zahl

Townships

 Athens
 Barr Butte
 Big Meadow
 Big Stone
 Blacktail
 Blue Ridge
 Bonetraill
 Brooklyn
 Buford
 Bull Butte
 Champion
 Climax
 Cow Creek
 Dry Fork
 Dublin
 East Fork
 Ellisville
 Equality
 Farmvale
 Golden Valley
 Good Luck
 Grenora
 Hardscrabble
 Hazel
 Hebron
 Judson
 Lindahl
 Marshall
 Missouri Ridge
 Mont
 New Home
 Oliver
 Orthell
 Pherrin 
 Pleasant Valley
 Rainbow
 Rock Island
 Round Prairie
 Sauk Valley
 Scorio
 South Meadow
 Springbrook
 Stony Creek
 Strandahl
 Tioga
 Trenton
 Truax
 Twelve Mile
 Tyrone
 View
 West Bank
 Wheelock
 Williston
 Winner

Defunct townships
 Hofflund

Politics
Williams County voters have been reliably Republican for decades. In no national election since 1964 has the county selected the Democratic Party candidate.

Education
School districts include:
 Divide County Public School District 1
 Eightmile Public School District 6
 Grenora Public School District 99
 Nesson Public School District 2
 Tioga Public School District 15
 Williston Basin School District 7

Former districts include:
 Williston Public School District 1 - Merged into Williston Basin 7 in 2021.
 Williams County Public School District 8 (formerly New Public School District 8, elementary only) - Merged into Williston Basin 7 in 2021.

See also
 National Register of Historic Places listings in Williams County, North Dakota
 North Dakota statistical areas

References

External links
 Map of southeastern portion of Williams County North Dakota DOT
 Map of northern portion of Williams County North Dakota DOT
 Map of southwestern portion of Williams County North Dakota DOT

 
1891 establishments in North Dakota
Populated places established in 1891
North Dakota counties on the Missouri River